Hollywood Pinafore, or The Lad Who Loved a Salary is a musical comedy in two acts by George S. Kaufman, with music by Arthur Sullivan, based on Gilbert and Sullivan's H.M.S. Pinafore. The work premiered on May 8, 1945, at Ford's Grand Opera House in Baltimore for tryouts. It opened on Broadway at the Alvin Theatre on May 31, 1945, and closed on July 14, 1945, after 52 performances. It was directed by Kaufman and starred Annamary Dickey as Brenda Blossom, Shirley Booth as Louhedda Hopsons, Victor Moore as Joseph W. Porter, George Rasely as Mike Corcoran, William Gaxton as Dick, and Mary Wickes as Miss Hebe.  The costumes were designed by Mary Percy Schenck. The adaptation transplants the maritime satire of the original Pinafore to a satire of the glamorous world of 1940s Hollywood film making, but Sullivan's score is retained with minor adaptations.

According to Howard Teichmann's 1972 biography George S. Kaufman: An Intimate Portrait, Kaufman had the inspiration for Hollywood Pinafore during a poker game with his friend Charles Lederer.  While Lederer was arranging his cards, he idly sang a few bars of "When I Was a Lad" from Pinafore while ad-libbing a new lyric: "Oh, he nodded his head / and he never said 'no' / and now he's the head of the studio."  Kaufman insisted on paying Lederer a token fee for the idea of transplanting Pinafore'''s setting to a Hollywood studio.

Although Kaufman's lyrics are witty, the book is static for a musical.  However, it has been revived a number of times in recent years, including a 1998 "Lost Musicals" staged concert production at the Barbican Centre in London.History of Lost Musicals lostmusicals.org, accessed June 1, 2009

Synopsis
Starlet Brenda Blossom, pining for a lowly writer, Ralph, is promised in marriage by her father (a director looking to advance his own career) to the studio head, Joseph Porter.  If she marries Ralph, she'll be tossed out of Hollywood and forced to make a living on the stage.  Everything turns out for the best when it is discovered that a mix-up in Louhedda Hopsons' gossip column was responsible for Ralph's fall from grace.  In reality, it was Ralph who was meant to head the studio instead of Porter.

Roles and Broadway cast
Joseph W. Porter, head of Pinafore Pictures – Victor Moore
Mike Corcoran, a director – George Rasely
Ralph Rackstraw, a writer – Gilbert Russell
Dick Live-Eye, an agent – William Gaxton
Brenda Blossom, a star – Annamary Dickey
Louhedda Hopsons, a columnist (a combination of the names of Louella Parsons and Hedda Hopper) – Shirley Booth
Bob Beckett, a press agent – Russ Brown
Miss Hebe, Mr. Porter's secretary – Mary Wickes
Miss Gloria Mundi – Diana Corday
Miss Beverly Wilshire – Pamela Randell
Little Miss Peggy – Ella Mayer
Doorman – Daniel De Paolo
Secretaries, Guard, Actors, Actresses, Assistant Directors, Cameramen, Technicians, Singers and Dancers

Musical numbers

Act I
 Simple Movie Folk - Miss Gloria Mundi, Miss Beverly Wilshire, Little Miss Peggy, Girls, Ensemble
 Little Butter-Up - Louhedda Hobson
 An Agent's Lot Is Not a Happy One - Dick Live-Eye
 A Maiden Often Seen - Ralph Rackstraw, Miss Beverly Wilshire, Ensemble
 I'm a Big Director at Pinafore - Mike Corcoran, Ensemble
 Here on the Lot - Brenda Blossom
 Joe Porter's Car is Seen - Male Chorus, Ensemble
 I Am the Monarch of the Joint - Joseph W. Porter, Miss Liebe, Ensemble
 When I Was a Lad - Joseph W. Porter, Ensemble
 A Writer Fills the Lowest Niche - Bob Beckett, Ralph Rackstraw, Guard, Ensemble
 Never Mind the Why and Wherefore - Dick Live-Eye, Ensemble
 Refrain, Audacious Scribe/Proud Lady, Have Your Way - Ralph Rackstraw, Brenda Blossom, Miss Liebe, Ensemble
 Can I Survive This Overbearing? (Finale Act 1) - Dick Live-Eye, Brenda Blossom, Miss Liebe, Ralph Rackstraw, Bob Beckett, Ensemble

ACT II
 Fair Moon - Mike Corcoran
 I Am the Monarch of the Joint (reprise) - Joseph W. Porter, Miss Liebe, Ensemble
 Ballet Interlude: Success Story - Chief Maid, Other Little Maids, Talent Scout, Her True Love, Two More Boys, Armand, the Movie Hero, Director, Studio Assistants
 Hollywood's a Funny Place - Louhedda Hobson, Joseph W. Porter
 To Go Upon the Stage - Brenda Blossom
 He Is a Movie Man - Joseph W. Porter, Dick Live-Eye, Ensemble
 The Merry Maiden and the Jerk - Dick Live-Eye, Joseph W. Porter
 Carefully on Tiptoe Stealing (music brazenly taken from The Pirates of Penzance) - Brenda Blossom, Ralph Rackstraw, Dick Live-Eye, Mike Corcoran, Ensemble
 Pretty Daughter of Mine - Mike Corcoran, Ralph Rackstraw, Miss Liebe, Joseph W. Porter, Dick Live-Eye, Ensemble
 Farewell, My Own - Ralph Rackstraw, Brenda Blossom, Miss Liebe, Joseph W. Porter, Louhedda Hobson, Bob Beckett, Ensemble
 This Town I Now Must Shake - Louhedda Hobson, Ensemble
 Finale Act 2 - Entire Company

References

Kaufman, George S, Hollywood Pinafore or the Lad Who Loved a Salary'', Dramatists Play Service (1998)

External links
 
Synopsis, roles and musical numbers
Brief description
Review of 1998 London production (archived)
Kathryn Kuhn and Mary Percy Schenck costume designs for Hollywood Pinafore, 1945., held by the Billy Rose Theatre Division, New York Public Library for the Performing Arts

Broadway musicals
1945 musicals
Adaptations of works by Gilbert and Sullivan
Musicals based on operas